, often abbreviated as SMEJ or simply SME, and also known as Sony Music Japan for short (stylized as SonyMusic), is a Japanese  music arm for Sony. Founded in 1968 as CBS/Sony, SMEJ is directly owned by Sony Group Corporation and is operating independently from the United States-based Sony Music Entertainment due to its strength in the Japanese music industry.
Its subsidiaries include the Japanese animation production enterprise, Aniplex, which was established in September 1995 as a joint-venture between Sony Music Entertainment Japan and Sony Pictures Entertainment Japan, but which in 2001 became a wholly owned subsidiary of Sony Music Entertainment Japan. It was prominent in the early to mid '90s producing and licensing music for animated series such as Roujin Z from acclaimed Japanese comic artist Katsuhiro Otomo and Capcom's Street Fighter animated series.

Until March 2007, Sony Music Japan also had its own North American sublabel, Tofu Records. Releases of Sony Music Japan now appear on Columbia Records and/or Epic Records in North America.

Sony does not have the trademark rights to the Columbia name in Japan, so releases under Columbia Records from another country appears on Sony Records in Japan, but retains the usage of the "walking eye" logo. The Columbia name and trademark is controlled by Nippon Columbia, which was, in fact, the licensee for the American Columbia Records up until 1968, even though relations were officially severed as far back as World War II. Nippon Columbia also does not have direct relations with the British Columbia Graphophone Company (an EMI subsidiary), so the licensee for the British Columbia Graphophone Company was actually Toshiba Musical Industries.

With Sony Corporation of America's buyout of Bertelsmann's stake in Sony BMG, Sony Music Entertainment Japan stepped in to acquire outstanding shares of BMG Japan from Sony BMG, making it a wholly owned subsidiary of Sony Music Japan.

History

Beginnings as CBS joint venture 
Sony Music Entertainment Japan was officially incorporated in March 1968 as a Tokyo-based 50/50 joint venture between Sony Corporation and U.S. conglomerate CBS to distribute the latter's music releases in Japan. The company was incorporated as CBS/Sony Records and with Sony co-founder Akio Morita as president.

Norio Ohga, who himself was a musician, was part of the management team from the formation of the company and served as president and representative director since April 1970. In 1972, when CBS/Sony was generating robust profits, Ohga was named chairman and at the same time gained further responsibility and influence within Sony. He would continue to work for the music company one morning a week. In 1980, Toshio Ozawa succeeded Ohga as  president.

In 1983, the company was renamed CBS/Sony Group.

Sony acquires The CBS Records Group in 1988 
In January 1988, after more than a year of negotiations, Sony acquired the CBS Records Group and the 50% of CBS/Sony Group that it did not already own.

In March 1988, four wholly owned subsidiaries were folded into CBS/Sony Group: CBS/Sony Inc., Epic/Sony Records Inc., CBS/Sony Records Inc. and Sony Video Software International.

The company was renamed Sony Music Entertainment (Japan), Inc.

Shugo Matsuo was named new president in January 1992, replacing Toshio Ozawa, who was appointed to the post of chairman.

Overall sales for the fiscal year ending March 31, 1991, were  83.8 billion yen with a pretax profit of 9.2 billion yen.

In June 1996, Ryokichi Kunugi became the new president. Shugo Matsuo was named chairman.

Shigeo Maruyama was appointed to the new post of CEO on October 1, 1997, and replaced Kunugi as president in February 1998.

As of 2019, Mizuno Michinori is the official CEO of the company.

In May 2018, SMEJ acquired a 39% stake in the Peanuts comic strip franchise from DHX Media.

Unties 

Sony Music Entertainment announced the launch of its first video game publishing label, Unties, in October 2017. Unties will publish indie games for the PlayStation 4, PlayStation VR, Nintendo Switch, and PC. The name was selected by Sony as representative of helping to "unleash" the power of independent video game development and "unshackle" such developers from the traditional video game publishing process.

Unties’ first release was Tiny Metal, a turn-based tactics video game developed by Area 35, for the Nintendo Switch, PS4, and PC. The game was first premiered at PAX West Indie Megabooth. Published Azure Reflections, a side-scrolling bullet hell developed by Souvenir Circ., on May 15, 2018, for the PS4. Published Touhou Gensou Wanderers Reloaded, a roguelike rpg developed by Aqua Style, for the PS4, Nintendo Switch, and PC. Published Necrosphere, a platformer developed by Cat Nigiri, for the PS4, Nintendo Switch, PC, and PSVita. Published Midnight Sanctuary, a VR/3D Novel game developed by CAVYHOUSE, for the PS4, Nintendo Switch and PC. Published Tokyo Dark, a visual novel mystery adventure hybrid developed by Cherrymochi, for the PC. Published Chiki-Chiki Boxy Racers, an arcade racing game developed by Pocket, for the Nintendo Switch on August 30, 2018. Scheduled to publish on Last Standard, a 3d action game developed by I From Japan, intended for PC. Scheduled to publish The Good Life, a daily-life rpg developed by White Owls Inc., for the PS4 and PC. Scheduled to publish Merkava Avalanche, a 3d cavalry warfare action game developed by WinterCrownWorks, for the PC. Scheduled to publish Olija, an action adventure game developed by Skeleton Crew Studio, for the PC. Scheduled to publish Deemo Reborn, a music rhythm and urban fantasy game developed by Taiwanese studio Rayak, for the PS4 with PSVR support. Scheduled to publish Giraffe and Anika, a 3d adventure game developed by Atelier Mimina, for the PS4, Nintendo Switch and PC. Scheduled to publish 3rd Eye, a 2d horror exploration game, based on the Touhou franchise, for the PS4, Nintendo Switch, and PC. Scheduled to publish Gensokyo Defenders, a tower-defense game developed by Neetpia, for the PS4 and Nintendo Switch. In 2019, Unties was dropped from the Sony group and became the new company Phoenixx.

Increased competition 
The company's leading role on the Japanese market was increasingly challenged by labels such as Avex (where SMEJ formerly owned 5 percent of shares).  Net sales for the fiscal year ending March 31, 1997, were down 10% to 103 billion yen, while net income fell 41% to 7.7 billion yen. The market share at that time was less than 18%. In August 1997, Dreams Come True, until that point Sony Music Entertainment Japan's best-selling act, signed a worldwide multi-album deal with competing U.S. label Virgin Records America.

Since then it was said that SMEJ ceded to Avex's challenge, but SMEJ bounced back and regained leadership from its indie rival until 2012. SMEJ netted 22.4 billion yen for 1H 2012 and 14.3% of the market, second behind Avex (24.95 B yen, 15.9%).

In May 2017, SMEJ, through subsidiary Sony Music Marketing (now Sony Music Solutions), acquired the physical retail and distribution rights to releases of another rival, Warner Music Japan.

Labels and sublabels

Active 
 Aniplex
A-1 Pictures
ANIPLEX.EXE
Aniplex of America
Aniplex Shanghai
Boundary
CloverWorks
 Crunchyroll, LLC (co-owned with Sony Pictures)
 Crunchyroll
Crunchyroll Anime Awards
 Crunchyroll EMEA
 Crunchyroll SAS
 Crunchyroll SA
 Crunchyroll GmbH
 Crunchyroll Games, LLC
VRV
 Crunchyroll UK and Ireland
 Madman Anime
 Crunchyroll Studios
 Right Stuf
 Nozomi Entertainment
 5 Points Pictures
 RightStufAnime.com
Peppermint Anime GmbH (co-owned with Peppermint Anime)
Quatro A
Rialto Entertainment
 Sony Music Labels
 Sony Music Records
 Sony Records - formerly known as CBS/Sony since 1968
 gr8! records (read "G-R-eight") – founded April 2003
 MASTERSIX FOUNDATION
 N46Div
 Niagara Records – private label of Eiichi Ohtaki
 Sony Music Japan International - distribution label for music from International version of Sony Music
 Epic Records Japan – formerly known as Epic/Sony since 1971
 Ki/oon Music – launched as Ki/oon Sony Records on April 1, 1992
 SME Records – founded 1998 and taken over the Japanese anime television series "Pocket Monsters" since 2013.
 Sony Music Associated Records
 onenation – joint venture with LDH
 Ariola Japan – formerly known as BMG Japan until October 2009.
 Sacra Music – anison label since 2017
 Sony Music Direct – founded as Sony Music House in 1996. Continues to use "Walking Eye" logo. Became part of Sony Music Labels in 2022.
 Music Ray'n
 Sony Music Solutions – Overseas distribution of labels which have a distribution and contract with SMEJ. Formerly known as Sony Music Distribution until 2014 and as Sony Music Marketing until 2019.

Defunct 
 Dohb Discs (1994–2000)
 Antinos Records was launched in 1994 with Sony Music director Shigeo Maruyama as its president. The first releases on August 21 were a mini-album by indie group Confusion and singles by the groups Aniss, Neverending Story, and Ginji Itoh. (1994–2004, merged into Epic Records Japan)
 Studioseven Recordings (2006–2010, merged into gr8! records)
 Tofu Records (US Sublabel, 2003–2007)
 DefSTAR Records – (2000–2015, merged into SME Records)
 Pikachu Records - (1997–2012, merged into SME Records & Sony Music Labels)
 VVV records
 OKeh was launched in 1994 and headed by Sony Music deputy president Hiroshi Inagaki.
 Former sublabels of Sony Music Associated Records
 TRUE KiSS DiSC -  private label of TETSUYA KOMURO
 tributelink - Temporary label in 2001
 TERRY DOLLAR RECORD$ - formerly private label of Oreskaband
 Yeah! Yeah! Yeah! Records - (2005–2010)
 Former sublabels of Ki/oon Music
 Fitz Beat
 Haunted Records
 Ki/oon Records2
 NeOSITE
 Siren Song - formerly private label of X Japan
 Trefort

Other services 

Has collaborated with SMEJ artists, most notably Yoasobi, which was initially formed to create music based on selected stories on the site.
 Sony Creative Products - Character licensing, usually working with overseas characters, such as the Peanuts franchise and Pingu.

Notable artists

Actors

Actress

Key people 
 Norio Ohga
 Akio Morita
 Toshio Ozawa
 Shugo Matsuo
 Ryokichi Kunugi
 Shigeo Maruyama
 Takashi Yoshida† (died 2010, transferred to Warner Music before death.)
 ViViD
 Hiroshi Inagaki (now on Avex Group)
 Naoki Kitagawa
 Kazutomo Enomoto
 Yaz Noya (Tofu Records founder)
 Nozomi Sasaki

See also 
 Sony Music Entertainment
 BMG Japan
 Music On! TV – SMEJ-owned cable TV network

Key rivals 
 Avex Group (once an affiliate of Sony Music, also the 2nd biggest record label in Japan.)
 Universal Music Japan
 Warner Music Japan

Notes

References

External links 
 Sony Music Entertainment (Japan) Inc. official website
 

 
Music Entertainment Japan
Japanese record labels
Record labels established in 1968
Entertainment companies of Japan
Mass media companies based in Tokyo
IFPI members
Chiyoda, Tokyo
Japanese companies established in 1968